The 2010 BH Tennis Open International Cup was a professional tennis tournament played on Hard courts. This was the nineteenth edition of the tournament which is part of the 2010 ATP Challenger Tour. It took place in Belo Horizonte, Brazil between 13 and 19 September 2010.

Singles main draw entrants

Seeds

 Rankings are as of September 30, 2010.

Other entrants
The following players received wildcards into the singles main draw:
  Gabriel Dias
  Tiago Fernandes
  Augusto Laranja
  Christian Lindell

The following players received entry from the qualifying draw:
  Gastão Elias
  Rodrigo Guidolin
  André Miele
  José Pereira

Champions

Singles

 Rogério Dutra da Silva def.  Facundo Argüello, 6–4, 6–3

Doubles

 Rodrigo Grilli /  Leonardo Kirche def.  Christian Lindell /  João Souza, 6–3, 6–3

External links
Official website
ITF Search 

BH Tennis Open International Cup
BH Tennis Open International Cup
BH Tennis Open International Cup